Seone Mendez (born 15 May 1999) is an Australian tennis player of Argentine descent.

Mendez has career-high WTA rankings of 198 in singles, achieved on 21 March 2022, and 304 in doubles, set on 20 September 2021. Mendez has won 12 ITF singles titles and three ITF doubles titles.

Career

2021
In July 2021, Mendez made her WTA Tour debut at the Winners Open, where she qualified for the main draw, defeating Irina Fetecău in the final qualifying round. Mendez went on to reach the quarterfinal in her WTA debut, losing in three sets to former world No. 9, Andrea Petkovic.

In October 2021, Mendez reached a career-high ranking of 206 and entered the Australian top 10.

2022
In January, Mendez reached the second round of the 2022 Australian Open qualifying.

Personal life
Mendez is the daughter of Natalia and footballer Gabriel Mendez, and the sister of Gian Mendez.

Grand Slam performance timelines

Singles

Doubles

ITF Circuit finals

Singles: 14 (12 titles, 2 runner–ups)

Doubles: 10 (3 titles, 7 runner-ups)

References

External links
 
 
 Seone Mendez at Tennis Australia

1999 births
Living people
Australian female tennis players
Tennis players from Sydney
Sportspeople from Valencia
Australian expatriate sportspeople in Spain
Australian people of Argentine descent
Sportswomen from New South Wales